Fahri Kasırga (born 20 January 1953, Rize, Turkey) is a Turkish lawyer and the current Secretary General of the Presidency of Turkey. In accordance with Article 114 of the Constitution of Turkey, he has served as a non-party Minister of Justice until the 2007 general elections, after which he joined the Justice and Development Party of Prime Minister Recep Tayyip Erdoğan.

He graduated from Istanbul University in 1977.

References

External links 

1953 births
Living people
Government ministers of Turkey
Istanbul University alumni
Istanbul University Faculty of Law alumni